"Breathin" is a song by American singer Ariana Grande and the third, final single from her fourth studio album Sweetener (2018). It was sent to contemporary hit radio stations in the United States on September 18, 2018. Produced by Ilya Salmanzadeh, "Breathin" is a dance-pop song that features synthesizers and an upbeat production incorporating disco and EDM elements. The lyrics discuss how breathing can alleviate panic attacks, based on Grande's experiences with post-traumatic stress disorder as a result of a terrorist bombing that killed 22 people in one of her concerts.

Called a highlight of Sweetener by many music critics, "Breathin" was praised for its motivational approach to discussing anxiety. Commercially, the single reached number one in Iceland and Israel and the top forty in twenty-seven additional countries. Two music videos for the song premiered in 2018. The first features Grande's pet piglet walking on a bed, intended as a comedic prelude to the "real" music video. Directed by Hannah Lux Davis, the video in question depicts Grande in a train station as commuters rush past her, representing how people often feel disconnected from their surroundings during panic attacks.

Background

Ariana Grande released her third studio album Dangerous Woman in 2016 to critical acclaim. It debuted at number two on the US Billboard 200 and was the 28th best-selling album of the year, with 900,000 copies sold worldwide. To support the album, Grande embarked on the Dangerous Woman Tour, which ran in 2017 and had four dates scheduled in the United Kingdom. During a concert in the Manchester Arena on May 22, a homemade bomb was detonated in a suicide terrorist attack, killing 22 concert-goers. After the bombing, Grande went through two highly publicized break-ups: one with rapper Mac Miller who died of an accidental overdose months later, and another with comedian Pete Davidson.

The Manchester Arena attack left Grande in a state of emotional turmoil, causing her to suffer from frequent symptoms of post-traumatic stress disorder. Her anxiety began manifesting through physical symptoms; Grande recalled being dizzy and unable to breathe properly once she returned home from tour. Due to her trauma, she took a hiatus from music, or what NME called a "moment of professional and personal stasis". Breaking up with Miller exacerbated her mental health problems. After his death, she frequently spoke in interviews about memories of their relationship.

Sweetener, released in 2018, marked Grande's first album since the Manchester Arena attack. Work on the album had begun back in 2016, but Grande temporarily halted recording because she wanted to cope with the bombing's aftermath first: "it would be nice to really hold my loved ones close for a little while, stay home for a little bit." She revealed the tracklist for Sweetener on July 2018; the album contains "Breathin" as its seventh track. She teased the song's title during the music video for "No Tears Left to Cry", Sweetener lead single released a month prior. During her appearance on The Tonight Show Starring Jimmy Fallon, Grande described "Breathin" as follows:

Recording and composition

Grande wrote "Breathin" with Savan Kotecha, Peter Svensson, and its producer Ilya Salmanzadeh. Her vocals were recorded by Sam Holland and Noah Passovoy at MXM Studios in Los Angeles, California, and Wolf Cousins Studios in Stockholm, Sweden. Cory Bice and Jeremy Lertola provided recording engineer assistance. Serban Ghenea, assisted by John Hanes, mixed the song at MixStar Studios in Virginia Beach, Virginia. Randy Merrill then mastered the song at Sterling Sound in New York City, New York.

"Breathin" is a dance-pop song backed by synthesizers and keytars. It is 3 minutes and 18 seconds long. The song features an upbeat rhythm, incorporating disco and EDM elements into its production. It depicts Grande in the middle of a panic attack, and it features shifts in dynamics or volume to evoke the feeling of anxiety. The song opens with a voice recording played backwards—when reversed, it reads "Tonight's your special night, do something magical."

The lyrics center around Grande's experiences with anxiety after going through the Manchester Arena attack. She describes the feeling in various ways: "Feel my blood runnin', swear the sky's falling / How do I know if this shit's fabricated?" As seen in one verse, Grande looks up to find "the whole room spinning" due to feeling drained of energy. In the hook, which she performs with airy vocals, she sings "just keep breathin' and breathin' and breathin' and breathin, repeatedly reminding herself to stay grounded in reality. Some music journalists drew connections between the lyrical themes and how Grande's mental well-being had been impacted by her break-up with Miller and his subsequent death.

Critical reception

"Breathin" received critical acclaim from music critics. Jillian Mapes from Pitchfork said that Grande turned "the melancholy of Drake into a meditation on anxiety with 'Breathin. Many music critics called "Breathin" a highlight of Sweetener. They praised the song for its upbeat arrangement, as well as its approach to discussing anxiety, commending the personal lyrics and its advice to practice self-care. Rolling Stone Ilana Kaplan highlighted the lushness of its production and the relatability of its depictions of panic, and she cited it as "one of Ariana's finest moments as an artist". Crystal Bell wrote for Teen Vogue: Breathin' embodies so much of what makes the Sweetener era so impressive: It channels pain into perseverance. A pop star can't save you, but she can give you the soundtrack to save yourself."

Commercial performance

Uupon the release of Sweetener, "Breathin" became a fan favorite and saw a relatively high increase in streams. It entered several charts worldwide due to strong digital sales. In the United States, the song debuted at number 22 on the Billboard Hot 100 issue dated September 1, 2018, earning Grande her fourteenth top-forty entry and marked the highest debut of nine entries from the album of which debuted on the Hot 100 the same week. The track sold 27,800 digital downloads in its opening week, allowing it to also enter the Digital Songs chart at number four. The following week, "Breathin" dropped fifteen positions to number 37 on the Hot 100. As radio airplay began to build, the track officially debuted at number 38 on the Mainstream Top 40. Consequently, Grande became the first female soloist to place three entires in the top forty of the Pop Songs chart that week since Lady Gaga did so in 2010. The song fluctuated on the Hot 100 for several weeks, and climbed from number 41 to 32 in its tenth week, jumping to number 21 the week after, overcoming its debut position of number 22. It reached a peak of number 12, and spent 25 weeks on the chart.

"Breathin" entered the Billboard Mainstream Top 40 at number 38 for the chart issue dated September 18, 2018, and moved up to number 34 the following week. The song has since climbed up to number two, earning Grande her ninth top-five single there and third from Sweetener. On the Billboard Dance Club Songs,  "Breathin" debuted at number 43 on the issue dated October 27, 2018, rising to number 27 in its second frame. The song reached the top spot in its seventh week on the chart, marking her third consecutive chart-topper and fourth overall.

Internationally, "Breathin" reached number one in Iceland and Israel. The song debuted at number eight as the highest entry of the week on both the Australian ARIA Charts and the UK Singles Chart, becoming her eighth top-ten single in both countries. The song has also reached the top-ten in the Czech Republic, Ireland, Hungary, Lebanon, Portugal and Slovakia, as well as reached the top-twenty in Austria, Canada, Denmark, Finland, New Zealand, Norway, Scotland, Sweden, and Switzerland.

On March 17, software company Calm announced that Grande would be included in the "Sleep Remix Series" for their meditation app, alongside other artists, such as Shawn Mendes and Kacey Musgraves. The following Friday, they released an hour-long remix of "Breathin" to Calm subscribers, which they described as "ethereal".

Live performances

Grande debuted the song live at The Sweetener Sessions. Grande also performed the song along with her single "Thank U, Next" on The Ellen DeGeneres Show on November 7, 2018. Grande performed the song as part of her set at the 2019 Coachella Valley Music and Arts Festival, Lollapalooza and Manchester Pride, as well as part of the regular setlist on her Sweetener World Tour.

Music videos

Two music videos for the song were released. Grande released the first music video of the song on October 10, 2018, starring her pet piglet, Piggy Smallz, curiously approaching the camera and walking around on a bed with a plush cover. Grande shot the footage. Grande posted on Instagram that she hoped the video would make fans laugh while they await the "real" music video. Critics found the first video funny and endearing, calling Piggy Smallz cute. Grande later revealed more news on the status of the official music video on November 3, 2018, via her Twitter account, stating that it would be released alongside the lead single of her fifth studio album. The music video was eventually released on November 7, 2018, on her YouTube account.

Hannah Lux Davis, who had worked on several of Grande's music videos in the past, directed the second music video for "Breathin". Filming took place within two weeks and had a turnaround time of one day, much to Davis's astonishment since most of the scenes involved some form of special effects. The video opens with alternating shots of Grande in a dimly lit bar and in a bright room filled with fog. Clouds, a motif present in her past visual works, appear in several scenes, often obscuring Grande's vision. At some points, she appears with a cloud for a head. One scene near the end of the video depicts her riding a swing in the sky. Daniel Welsh of The Huffington Post thought this represented Grande's triumph over her anxiety. 

Multiple shots in the video depict Grande in a busy train station as commuters rush around her in a time lapse effect that makes them look blurry. It symbolizes how people often feel disconnected from their surroundings during panic attacks. Davis achieved this effect through motion control photography, filming Grande at a slower frame rate than the people walking past her. In one scene, Grande sits atop a pile of luggage, interpreted by Kathryn Lindsay of Refinery29 as a metaphor for her mental health struggles, which include trauma from the Manchester Arena bombing, Miller's death, and her break-up with Davidson. In another, the camera focuses on a departure sign that includes the words "needy", "remember" and "imagine", which many viewers thought was an Easter egg teasing the tracklist for Grande's next studio album, Thank U, Next (2019).

Credits and personnel
Credits and personnel adapted from the liner notes of Sweetener.

Recording and management
 Recorded at MXM Studios (Los Angeles, California) and Wolf Cousins Studios (Stockholm, Sweden)
 Mixed at MixStar Studios (Virginia Beach, Virginia)
 Mastered at Sterling Sound (New York City, New York)
 Published by Universal Music Group Corp./Grand AriMusic (ASCAP), Wolf Cousins, Warner/Chappell Music Scandinavia (STIM) and MXM (ASCAP) — administered by Kobalt (ASCAP)

Personnel

Ariana Grande – vocals, songwriting, vocal production
Ilya – songwriting, production, backing vocals, keyboards, bass, drums, guitar, programming
Savan Kotecha – songwriting
Peter Svensson – songwriting
Max Martin – keyboards
Sam Holland – recording
Noah Passovoy – recording
Cory Bice – recording engineer assistance
Jeremy Lertola – recording engineer assistance
Serban Ghenea – mixing
John Hanes – mixing assistance
Randy Merrill – mastering

Charts

Weekly charts

Year-end charts

Certifications

Release history

See also
 List of number-one dance singles of 2018 (U.S.)

Notes

References

2018 singles
2018 songs
Ariana Grande songs
Dance-pop songs
Music videos directed by Hannah Lux Davis
Number-one singles in Iceland
Number-one singles in Israel
Song recordings produced by Ilya Salmanzadeh
Songs about diseases and disorders
Songs about anxiety
Songs written by Ariana Grande
Songs written by Ilya Salmanzadeh
Songs written by Peter Svensson
Songs written by Savan Kotecha
Republic Records singles